The Adams Forward Bend Test is used in many situations to diagnose scoliosis, however it is not a primary source for a diagnosis. 
This test is often used at schools and doctors offices to check for scoliosis. The patient bends forward, as if they are diving. If the patient has scoliosis, their back often has a prominent line where the spine is, and one side is higher than the other.  A patient's back is completely straight if they do not have scoliosis.

William Adams described the Forward Bending Test for scoliosis in 1865. His understanding of the nature of the rotational element of scoliosis was given by a postmortem he performed on an eminent surgeon and geologist, Gideon Mantell. The clinical history of Dr. Mantell is well documented.

References

Physical examination